This is a list of commissioned naval bases of the Royal New Zealand Navy from its formation on 1 October 1941 to the present. The Royal New Zealand Navy follows the British tradition of commissioning land naval bases as though they were ships.  The administrative structures that work for a ship work just as well for a land establishment. The commander of a ship can become the commander of a land establishment, and be entirely comfortable with the way the place is run. This simplifies the overall administration of the navy. For this reason, naval bases are sometimes referred to as stone frigates.

In earlier times or in wartime, naval bases actually were ships. HMS Philomel was an old cruiser which functioned as New Zealand's first naval base. HMNZS Kahu was a Fairmile B motor launch, and it functioned as an administrative base for the Fairmile flotillas during World War II.

It is also in this tradition for land establishments to be associated with one or more "name ships". However this association is largely ceremonial.

List of bases

HMNZ Dockyard  is managed by Babcock New Zealand Ltd on behalf of the Chief of Naval Staff through a commercial management agreement. This is not a commissioned ship; it is instead analogous to HMNB Devonport or HMNB Portsmouth.

See also
 Current Royal New Zealand Navy ships
 List of ships of the Royal New Zealand Navy

Notes

References
 Walters, Sydney David (1956) The Royal New Zealand Navy: Official History of World War II, Department of Internal Affairs, Wellington Online
 McDougall, R J  (1989) New Zealand Naval Vessels., Page 157-160. Government Printing Office. 
Royal New Zealand Navy –  Official web site

 
Military history of New Zealand
Bases
New Zealand military-related lists
Naval lists